The Fairchild Channel F, short for "Channel Fun", is a video game console, the first to be based on a microprocessor and to use ROM cartridges instead of having games built-in. It was launched as the "Video Entertainment System", but when Atari released its Video Computer System the next year, Fairchild rebranded their machine as "Channel F" while keeping the Video Entertainment System descriptor.

The Fairchild Channel F achieved only about 350,000 units before Fairchild sold the technology to Zircon International in 1979, trailing well behind the VCS. The system was discontinued in 1983.

History 

In 1974, Alpex Computer Corporation employees Wallace Kirschner and Lawrence Haskel developed a home video game prototype consisting of a base unit centered on an Intel 8080 microprocessor and interchangeable circuit boards containing ROM chips that could be plugged into the base unit. The duo attempted to interest several television manufacturers in the system, but were unsuccessful. Next, they contacted a buyer at Fairchild, which sent engineer Jerry Lawson to evaluate the system. Lawson was impressed by the system and suggested Fairchild license the technology, which the company did in January 1976.

Lawson worked with industrial designer Nick Talesfore and mechanical engineer Ron Smith to turn the prototype into a viable project. Jerry Lawson replaced the 8080 with Fairchild's own F8 CPU; while Nick Talesfore and Ron Smith were responsible for adapting the prototype's complex keyboard controls into a single control stick, and encasing the ROM circuit boards into plastic cartridges reminiscent of 8-track tapes. Talesfore, providing Industrial Design (ID), and Ron Smith, providing Mechanical Engineering (ME), collaborated on the styling and function of the 8 degrees of freedom hand controller. They were responsible for the design of the hand controllers, console, and video game cartridges. In addition to providing the ID for this system, Talesfore also art directed Tom Kamafugi, the graphic designer who did the original graphic design for the early video cartridges cartons.

The system was also released in Japan (チャンネル F) in October 1977.

Channel F System II 

Lawson moved on to form his own company, Video Soft in 1980. Talesfore continued working on the system at Fairchild, and eventually a number of these improvements resulted in the improved System II. The major changes were that the controllers were now removable, using the Atari joystick port connector (not Atari compatible), and their storage was moved to the back of the machine. The sound was now mixed into the RF modulator so you could adjust it on your TV set instead of a fixed volume internal speaker. The internal electronics were also simplified, with two custom logic chips replacing the standard TTL logic chips. This resulted in a much smaller motherboard which allowed for a smaller, simpler and more modern-looking case design.

Some time in 1979, Zircon International bought the rights to the Channel F and released the re-designed console as the Channel F System II to compete with Atari's VCS. Channel F II struggled, managing to only release six new games after the debut before its demise; several of these were developed at Fairchild before they sold the rights.

Licensed variants 

A number of licensed versions were released in Europe, including the Luxor Video Entertainment System in Sweden, Adman Grandstand Video Entertainment Computer (Channel F II) in the UK, the SABA Videoplay, ITT Telematch Processor and Nordmende Color TelePlay µP from Germany, and the Barco Challenger, Dumont Videoplay and Emerson Videoplay from the Barco/Dumont/Emerson company in Italy and Belgium. Swedish Luxor also released the Channel F II as Luxor Video Entertainment Computer.

Design 

The F8 was very innovative compared to the existing processors and typical integrated circuits of the day. Because chip packaging was not initially available with enough pins, a few pins were used to communicate with other chips in the system. You needed at least two chips to set up an F8 processor system to be able run any code. The savings from using standard pin layout enabled the inclusion of 64 Bytes of internal scratchpad RAM in the CPU.
The VES/Channel F, as well as the System II, had one CPU and two storage chips (PSU:s). 
(A single-chip variant of the F8 was used by the VideoBrain computer system).

The Channel F is able to use one plane of graphics and one of four background colors per line, with three plot colors to choose from (red, green, and blue) that turns white if the background is set to black, at a resolution of 128 × 64, with approximately 104 × 60 pixels visible on the TV screen. This VRAM or framebuffer was "write only" and not usable for anything else. There was only 64 Bytes of scratchpad RAM for general use - half the amount of the later Atari 2600. The Maze game (Videocart-10) and Hangman game (Videocart-18) used 1024 bits of on-cartridge static RAM connected directly to one PSU port - adding to the cost of manufacturing it. The Chess game contained considerably more on-cartridge RAM than that, 2048 Bytes accomplished by using an F8 memory interface circuit to be able to use industry standard ROM and RAM. 
The F8 processor at the heart of the console is able to produce enough AI to allow for player versus computer matches, a first in console history. All previous machines required a human opponent. Tic-Tac-Toe on Videocart-1 had this feature, it was only for one player against the machine. The same is true for the chess game, which could have very long turn times for the computer as the game progressed, depending on the set difficulty.

In the original unit, sound is played through an internal speaker, rather than the TV set. However, the System II passed sound to the television through the RF modulator.

The Channel F is also the first video game console to feature a pause function; There is a 'Hold' button on the main unit of the console which allows players to freeze inside the two built-in games and change several game settings in the meantime. Button is controlled through code so it was used for other things in other games.

Controllers 

The controllers are a joystick without a base; the main body is a large handgrip with a triangular "cap" on top, the top being the portion that actually moved for eight-way directional control. It could be used as both a joystick and paddle (twist), and not only could it be pushed down to operate as a fire button, it could be pulled up as well. The model 1 unit contained a small compartment for storing the controllers when moving it or when not in use. The System II featured detachable controllers with two holders at the back to wind the cable around and to store the controller in. Zircon later offered a special controller that featured an action button on the front of the joystick. It was marketed by Zircon as "Channel F Jet-Stick" in a letter sent out to registered owners before Christmas 1982.

One feature, unique to the console, is the 'hold' button, which allows the player to freeze the game, change the time or speed of the game. The hold function is however not universal (like the hardwired reset) as the four buttons are set up in code. The programmer can choose their function/purpose. The text labels explains the button functions in the built-in games (and some of the Videocarts).

Despite the failure of the Channel F, the joystick's design was so popular—Creative Computing called it "outstanding"— that Zircon also released an Atari joystick port-compatible version, the Video Command Joystick, first released without the extra fire button. Before that, only the downwards plunge motion was connected and acted as the fire button; the pull-up and twist actions were not connected to anything.

Technical specifications 

 CPU microprocessor: Fairchild F8 (8-bit) operating at 1.7897725 MHz (NTSC colorburst/2). PAL gen. 1: 2.0000 MHz, gen. 2: 1.9704910 MHz (double PAL colorburst/9)
 RAM: 2 KB VRAM (128 × 64 × 2 bits) for the write only framebuffer plus 64 bytes of scratchpad memory.
 Additional SRAM supported via add-in cartridges. Maze and Hangman has 1K x 1 bit, expanded with 3853 SMI Chess has 2048 Bytes. 
 Resolution: Approximately columns 3-107 and rows 2-62 are visible, depending on TV. (Columns 125 and 126 controls palette per row). Although VRAM could cover 128 × 64 pixels, 
 Refresh rate: 60 Hz
 Colors: 8 colors (either black/white lines or lines using background grey/blue/green with red, green or blue pixels)
 Audio: 120 Hz, 500 Hz and 1 kHz beeps (can be modulated to produce different tones). Quality is quite superior on the System II, versus the original model.
 Input: two custom game controllers, hardwired to the console (original release) or removable (Channel F System II)
 Output: RF modulated composite video signal, cord hardwired to console in original release, detachable in System II.

Games 

Twenty-seven cartridges, termed "Videocarts", were officially released to consumers in the United States during the ownership of Fairchild and Zircon, the first twenty-one of which were released by Fairchild. The Videocarts were yellow and approximately the size and overall texture of an 8 track cartridge. They usually featured colorful label artwork. The earlier artwork was created by nationally known artist Tom Kamifuji and art directed by Nick Talesfore. The console contained two built-in games, Tennis and Hockey, which were both advanced Pong clones. In Hockey, the reflecting bar could be changed to different diagonals by twisting the controller knob and could move all over the playing field. Tennis was much like the original Pong.

A sales brochure from 1978 listed "Keyboard Videocarts" for sale. The three shown were K-1 Casino Poker, K-2 Space Odyssey, and K-3 Pro-Football. These were intended to use the Keyboard accessory. All further brochures, released after Zircon took over Fairchild, never listed this accessory nor anything called a Keyboard Videocart.

There was one cartridge released outside the numbered series, listed as Videocart-51 and simply titled "Demo 1". This Videocart was shown in a single sales brochure released shortly after Zircon acquired the company. It hasn't been seen listed for sale after this single brochure which was sent out in the winter of 1979.

 Democart (was briefly available to the general public)
 Democart 2 

Unreleased carts:
 Keyboard Videocart-1: Casino Poker
 Keyboard Videocart-2: Space Odyssey
 Keyboard Videocart-3: Pro-Football

German electronics manufacturer SABA also released a few compatible carts different from the original carts: translation in Videocart-1 Tic-Tac-Toe to German words, Videocart-3 released with different abbreviations (German), and Videocart-18 changed graphics and has a German word list.

In 2021, a number of new 'Homebrew' games were released on itch.io by retro developer Arlasoft. These included ports of mobile puzzle games Tents & Trees, 2048 and Threes, as well as a port of the classic arcade shooter Centipede. These were released on cartridge as Videocart-29.

Reception 

The Channel F had beaten the Atari VCS to the market, but once the VCS was released, sales of the Channel F fell, attributed to the types of games that were offered. Most of the Channel F titles were slow-paced educational and intellectual games, compared to the action-driven games that launched with the VCS. Even with the redesigned Channel F II in 1978, Fairchild was unable to meet the sales that the VCS and its games were generating. By the time Fairchild sold the technology to Zircon in 1979, around 350,000 total units had been sold.

Ken Uston reviewed 32 games in his book Ken Uston's Guide to Buying and Beating the Home Video Games in 1982, and rated some of the Channel F's titles highly; of these, Alien Invasion and Video Whizball were considered by Uston to be "the finest adult cartridges currently available for the Fairchild Channel F System". The games on a whole, however, rated last on his survey of over 200 games for the Atari, Intellivision, Astrocade and Odyssey consoles, and contemporary games were rated "Average" with future Channel F games rated "below average". Uston rated almost one-half of the Channel F games as "high in interest" and called that "an impressive proportion" and further noted that "Some of the Channel F cartridges are timeless; no matter what technological developments occur, they will continue to be of interest." His overall conclusion was that the games "serve a limited, but useful, purpose" and that the "strength of the Channel F offering is in its excellent educational line for children".

In 1983, after Zircon announced its discontinuation of the Channel F, Video Games reviewed the console. Calling it "the system nobody knows", the magazine described its graphics and sounds as "somewhat primitive by today's standards". It described Space War as "may be the most antiquated game of its type still on the market", and rated the 25 games for the console with an average "interest grade" of three ("not too good") on a scale from one to ten and "skill rating" at an average 4,5 of 10. The magazine stated, however, that Fairchild "managed to create some fascinating games, even by today's standards", calling the poker game Casino Royale (actually Videocart-25, Casino Poker) "the best card game, from blackjack to bridge, made for any TV-game system". It also favorably reviewed Dodge-It ("simple but great"), Robot War ("Berzerk without guns"), and Whizball ("thoroughly original ... hockey with guns"), but concluded that only those interested in nostalgia, video game collecting, or card games would purchase the Channel F in 1983.

See also 

TV Powww

References

External links 

 The Dot Eaters article with a history of the Channel F and games
 Interview with designer Jerry Lawson
 MobyGames list of Channel F games
 Channel F wiki and gallery of labels, instructions, and boxes
 Patent: Cartridge programmable video game apparatus US 4095791 A
 The Untold Story of the Invention of the Video Game Cartridge—how the Channel F's video game cartridge was created (January 22, 2015).
 Channel F was 1977's top game system—before Atari wiped it out at The A.V. Clubs AUX (4/09/2017)
 Channel F games playable for free in the browser at the Internet Archive Console Living Room

Computer-related introductions in 1976
Home video game consoles
Second-generation video game consoles
Fairchild Corporation
Products introduced in 1976
1976 in video gaming